Cheeyang Ng, also known as Zhiyang, is a Singaporean singer-songwriter currently based in New York City. Ng had performed around the world, including Lincoln Center with Carole King and Carnegie Hall with a cappella group Vocalosity. He got his start from winning the first season of Campus SuperStar in Singapore, going on to represent Singapore in Taiwan CTV's One Million Star. He is a graduate of Berklee College of Music and New York University Tisch School of the Arts Graduate Musical Theatre Writing.

Education
Ng studied Business in Singapore Management University under the University Scholar's Programme from 2009 to 2010. He transferred to Berklee College of Music, Boston, Massachusetts and graduated in May 2013 with Bachelor of Music. 

Ng completed his Masters of Fine Arts at NYU's Graduate Musical Theatre Writing Program in May 2019.

Music career
In 2005, Ng participated in the F.I.R singing competition organised by KBox. Out of the three finalists, he was the only male competitor. With F.I.R's 無限, a single in their 2nd album, Unlimited, he won the competition and managed to perform on stage together with F.I.R at IMM Shopping Mall.

In 2006, Ng represented Hwa Chong Institution, winning the overall champion title of Season 1 Campus SuperStar, a nationwide singing competition conducted by Mediacorp.

After winning the competition, he was involved in numerous performances, including the Singapore Youth Festival Opening and Closing Ceremony in 2006, where he performed the Theme Song 'Reaching Beyond'; the International Physics Olympiad 2006 Closing Ceremony; and also participated in a Mediacorp Drama Series, Let It Shine screened in January 2007.

In 2009, Ng represented Singapore in One Million Star Season 5 talent competition in Taiwan as a wildcard competitor. In 2010, he also performed as a featured vocalist in the Inaugural 2010 Summer Youth Olympic Games held in Singapore.

He is also vying for a role on the next Season of Glee by taking part in Season 2 of The Glee Project in the United States.

He is the founder of Singapore's a cappella group The Apex Project.

References

External links
Cheeyang's Website
East Side Story Podcast

21st-century Singaporean male singers
Singaporean Mandopop singers
Singaporean people of Chinese descent
Hwa Chong Institution alumni
Singapore Management University alumni
Berklee College of Music alumni
Living people
1989 births
One Million Star contestants